Cristian Andrés Olivares López (born 23 May 1976) is a Chilean former professional footballer who played as a attacking midfielder for clubs in Chile and Indonesia. He also was a Chile international beach soccer and futsal player.

Club career

After a stint with Coquimbo Unido in 1999, he joined Colo-Colo in 2000. Despite he made appearances in friendly matches and the  during the preseason, he made no appearances in the league. Then he returned to Coquimbo Unido until 2001, playing after for Deportes Temuco and Deportes Antofagasta.

Abroad, he played in Indonesia between 2004 and 2007 for Persekabpas Pasuruan, Petrokimia Putra and Persema Malang.

International career
Following his retirement as a football player, he represented the Chile beach soccer team in both the 2008 and the 2009 South American Championships, alongside retired professional footballers such as Rodrigo Sanhueza, Rodrigo Cuevas, Germán Osorio and Carlos Medina, with Miguel Ángel Gamboa as coach. In 2010, he also won the XI Copa Latina.

In 2010, he also represented the Chile futsal team in the South American Games, while he was a futsal player of Unión Española.

Post retirement
Olivares graduated as a PE teacher at the Alberto Hurtado University and has spent time as futsal and football coach, teacher and sports assistant at the same university as well as other institutions such as Andrés Bello University and football academies.

He has taken part of matches for "Colo-Colo de Todos los Tiempos", a team made up by former players of Colo-Colo.

Personal life
He is the older brother of Richard Olivares, who also played for Magallanes, Deportes Temuco, Deportes Antofagasta and Coquimbo Unido.

He was nicknamed Chico (Little) due to his height.

Honours
Magallanes
 Tercera División de Chile: 

Chile (beach soccer)
 Copa Latina: 2010

References

External links
 
 Cristian Olivares at FootballDatabase.eu

1976 births
Living people
People from Antofagasta
Chilean footballers
Chilean expatriate footballers
C.D. Antofagasta footballers
Deportes Magallanes footballers
Magallanes footballers
Coquimbo Unido footballers
Colo-Colo footballers
Deportes Temuco footballers
Persekabpas Pasuruan players
Petrokimia Putra players
Persema Malang players
Chilean Primera División players
Tercera División de Chile players
Primera B de Chile players
Chilean expatriate sportspeople in Indonesia
Expatriate footballers in Indonesia
Association football midfielders
Chilean men's futsal players